1. Fußball-Club Düren e.V., commonly known as 1. FC Düren, is a German association football club based in the town of Düren, North Rhine-Westphalia.

History

FC Düren-Niederau 
FC Düren-Niederau was founded in the year 1908 as FC 08 Niederau-Krauthausen and later adopted the name FC Düren-Niederau. The team's greatest success was being promoted into the Verbandsliga Mittelrhein in 1981, in which they would later go on to reach fourth place in the 1984/85 season — the best performance in the club's history. In 1991 the club were relegated from the league. In 2008 they were re-promoted into the league, but were shortly relegated at the end of the next season. In 2012 they then were relegated further from the Verbandsliga to the Bezirksliga, but  promptly re-entered the Verbandsliga the following season. Their junior teams also showed great success, with the C-Juniors winning the Mittelrheinpokal in 2005 and 2012, and the D-Juniors in 2000 and 2004. Johanna Elsig became the 2009 UEFA Women's Under-17 Championship champion.

SG GFC Düren 99 
The partnering club to 1. FC Düren, SG GFC Düren 99, is a product of multiple fusions between other clubs and a team associated with two Germany national football team players: Karl-Heinz Schnellinger and Georg Stollenwerk. Their roots stem back to 1899, where the team was founded as Germania Düren. On August 8th 1935 this team would then fuse with Düren SC 03 to form SG Düren 99. SG Düren 99 would go on to play in the top division Gauliga Mittelrhein league during the 1930s, and then later in the second division 2. Oberliga West following the end of World War II. During the 1980s and 90s the club were often without success found themselves in a downward spiral and would end up in Kreisliga B. On June 29th 2001 the team would fuse with Schwarz-Weiß Düren to form SG Schwarz-Weiß Düren 99. Six years later, however, Schwarz-Weiß Düren was re-founded as a separate team. On April 1st 2011 SG Düren 99 merged with GFC Düren 09, who had played in the fourth division Oberliga Nordrhein from 2002-2007, to form the current team: SG GFC Düren 99.

Founding of 1. FC Düren 
1. FC Düren was founded on 30 November 2017, and took over the football section of FC Düren-Niederau, which finished the 2017–18 season in the sixth-division Landesliga Mittelrhein under their old name. On 25 April 2018, the Middle Rhine Football Association approved the merger of the youth and senior football departments of SG GFC Düren 99, also playing in the Landesliga Mittelrhein, with 1. FC Düren, which took effect on 15 June 2018. FC Düren-Niederau finished the 2017–18 season in third place, while SG GFC Düren 99 won the Landesliga Mittelrhein and earned promotion, resulting in 1. FC Düren playing their inaugural 2018–19 season in the fifth-division Mittelrheinliga.

During the 2018–19 season, 1. FC Düren reached the semi-finals of the Middle Rhine Cup before losing to Alemannia Aachen, and finished eighth in the Mittelrheinliga. In the following season under new manager Giuseppe Brunetto, Düren finished in second place in the league behind FC Wegberg-Beeck after the season was curtailed due to the COVID-19 pandemic. In addition, the club won the Middle Rhine Cup against Alemannia Aachen, securing their qualification for the 2020–21 DFB-Pokal, in which they were drawn against record German league and cup winners Bayern Munich.

Stadium
The club plays its home matches at the Westkampfbahn in Düren, which has a capacity of 6,000. The stadium was opened on 9 August 1914, and was last renovated in 2014. Prior to foundation of 1. FC Düren, the clubs Germania Düren, SG Düren 99 and SG GFC Düren 99 also played at the stadium.

Recent seasons
The recent season-by-season performance of the club:

Honours
The club's honours:
 Middle Rhine Cup
 Champions: 2019–20

References

External links
  

Football clubs in Germany
Football clubs in North Rhine-Westphalia
Association football clubs established in 2017
2017 establishments in Germany